Little Rock to Leipzig is a 1990 album by British folk-rock band Oysterband. The album is a mixture of live and studio recordings, also a mixture of traditional songs, original recordings and covers of contemporary songs including "I Fought the Law" by Sonny Curtis and "Gonna Do What I Have to Do" by Phil Ochs.

Track listing
 "Jail Song Two" (Ian Telfer/John Jones/Alan Prosser) - 4:03
 "The Oxford Girl" (Jones/Telfer) - 4:21
 "Gonna Do what I Have to Do" (Phil Ochs) - 3:15
 "Too Late Now" (Telfer/Prosser/Jones/Ian Kearey) - 2:17
 "Galopede" (Trad.) - 3:00
 "Red Barn Stomp" (Oysterband) - 4:33
 "I Fought the Law" (Sonny Curtis) - 3:54
 "Coal not Dole" (Kay Sutcliffe) - 2:03
 "New York Girls" (Trad.) - 5:04
 "Johnny Mickey Barry's/Salmon Tails Down the Water" (Trad.) - 5:16

External links
 Allmusic review

Oysterband albums
Cooking Vinyl albums
1990 albums